The Sprite Ball Championship  is an annual inter-high schools basketball tournament in Ghana. Its objective is to unearth talents and develop existing ones amongst the high schools in Ghana. It is organized by the RiteSport, a sports management group in Ghana.

History 
The Sprite Ball Championship began on 2 January 2007 at the Aviation Social Center, Accra. It commenced with over thirty Senior High Schools participating in the competition. Since its inception, it has been played in eight regions namely, Greater Accra . Ashanti, Western, Eastern, Brong Ahafo, Northern, Central  and Volta regions. It has engaged over 300 Senior High Schools with an annual attendance of between 5,000-10,000 spectators.

Seasons

2 January 2007

2 January 2008

21 December 2008

21--22 December 2009

22-23 December 2010

2011-2012 (Sprite Ball @ 5)

2012/2013

2014

2015

2016

2016/2017 (Sprite Ball @ 400)

Boys Winners 

There was no winner for the 2020 edition as the winning school Keta Business College, fielded unqualified players. This resulted in them being stripped of the title after investigations exposed the irregularity. They were also banned indefinitely from the competition.

Girls Winners

Sponsors 
 Coca-Cola Company Ghana
 Sprite Ghana

References

External links
 (official website)

Basketball in Ghana
Sports leagues established in 2007
2007 establishments in Ghana